Márton Illés (born 12 December 1975 in Budapest), is a Hungarian composer and pianist.

Illés received musical training in piano, composition and percussion in Győr from 1981 to 1994. In 1993 he spent one academical term at the conservatory of Zurich with pianist Hadassa Schwimmer. He studied the piano with László Gyimesi at the Hochschule für Musik Basel, completing his solo diploma in 1998. He continued his piano studies with Karl-Heinz Kämmerling in Hannover. He studied composition with Detlev Müller-Siemens from 1997 to 2001 in Basel, with Wolfgang Rihm and music theory under Michael Reudenbach at the Hochschule für Musik Karlsruhe from 2001 to 2005.

In 2006, Illés founded the Scene Polidimensionali chamber music ensemble

He won an Ernst von Siemens Composers' Prize in 2008, and a scholarship to the Villa Massimo in 2009.

His first large scale stage work, Die weiße Fürstin, was given its world premiere in April 2010 at the Munich Biennale in a co-production with Theater Kiel.  Further performances then took place in Kiel in May and June of that year.

Works 
The works of Illés are published by Breitkopf & Härtel.

 Víz-Szín-tér, for orchestra (2019)
 Vont-tér, for violin and chamber orchestra (2019)
 Ez-tér, for large orchestra (2017)
 Re-Akvarell, for clarinet and large orchestra (2015)
 Tört-Szín-tér, for large orchestra (2014/15)
 Rajzok II, for piano and large orchestra (2011)

Stage works

References

External links
Márton Illés official website.
Márton Illés at Breitkopf & Härtel.

1975 births
21st-century classical composers
Hochschule für Musik Karlsruhe alumni
Hungarian classical composers
Hungarian male classical composers
Living people
Hungarian opera composers
Male opera composers
Musicians from Budapest
Ernst von Siemens Composers' Prize winners
21st-century Hungarian male musicians